Nesa may refer to:

Places
 Nesa, ancient city in Anatolia
 Nesa, Alborz, a village in Alborz Province, Iran
 Nesa-e Olya, a village in Alborz Province, Iran
 Nesa-ye Sofla, a village in Alborz Province, Iran
 Nesa, Gilan, a village in Gilan Province, Iran
 Nesa, Hormozgan, a village in Hormozgan Province, Iran
 Nesa-ye Olya, a village in Kohgiluyeh and Boyer-Ahmad Province, Iran
 Nesa, Qazvin, a village in Qazvin Province, Iran
 Nesa Rural District, in Alborz Province, Iran
 Nisa, Turkmenistan, also transliterated as Nesa

Animals
 Nesa (butterfly), a genus of gossamer-winged butterflies

Other
Australia
 NSW Education Standards Authority

Finland
National Emergency Supply Agency

New Zealand 
 No One Ever Stands Alone, a New Zealand based charity started in 2016 to raise the awareness of drunk and drugged driving and support victims and their families

United Arab Emirates
 National Electronic Security Authority, the country's intelligence agency

United Kingdom
 National Electronic Sectional Appendix

United States
 National Eagle Scout Association
 Near East South Asia Center for Strategic Studies, National Defense University in Washington, DC
 Near East and South Asia directorate, the Pentagon 
 New England Sociological Association

See also

Nela (name)
Nisa (disambiguation)
Nysa (disambiguation)
Nyssa (disambiguation)